Glenea nympha is a species of beetle in the family Cerambycidae. It was described by James Thomson in 1865. It is known from Borneo and Malaysia.

References

nympha
Beetles described in 1865